Ruby City is a contemporary art museum in San Antonio, Texas.

Founded by Linda Pace and housing her collection of contemporary art, the museum opened in 2019. The building was designed by David Adjaye. Entrance is free.

The museum director is Elyse A. Gonzales.

See also 
 Artpace
 List of museums in Central Texas

References

External links 

 Official website

2019 establishments in Texas
Contemporary art galleries
Art museums and galleries in Texas
Museums in San Antonio
Linda Pace